Metallurgy in China has a long history, with the earliest metal objects in China dating back to around 3,000 BCE. The majority of early metal items found in China come from the North-Western Region (mainly Gansu and Qinghai, 青海). China was the earliest civilization to use the blast furnace and produce cast iron.

Copper
Archaeological evidence indicates that the earliest metal objects in China were made in the late fourth millennium BCE. Copper was generally the earliest metal to be used by humanity, and was used in China since at least 3000 BCE.

Early metal-using communities have been found at the Qijia and Siba sites in Gansu, with similar sites in Xinjiang in the west and Shandong, Liaoning and Inner Mongolia in the east and north. The Central Plain sites associated with the Erlitou culture also contain early metalworks.

Copper manufacturing, more complex than jade working, gradually appeared in the Yangshao period (5000–3000 BCE). Jiangzhai is the only place where copper artifacts were found in the Banpo culture. Archaeologists have found remains of copper metallurgy in various cultures from the late fourth to the early third millennia BCE. These include the copper-smelting remains and copper artifacts of the Hongshan culture (4700–2900) and copper slag at the Yuanwozhen site. This indicates that inhabitants of the Yellow River valley had already learned how to make copper artifacts by the later Yangshao period.

The Qijia culture (c. 2500–1900) of Qinghai, Gansu, and western Shaanxi produced copper and bronze utilitarian items and gold, copper, and bronze ornaments. The earliest metalworks in this region are found at a Majiayao site at Linjia, Dongxiang, Gansu. "Their dates range from 2900 to 1600 BCE. These metal objects represent the Majiayao 馬家窯 type of the Majiayao culture (c. 3100–2700 BCE), Zongri 宗日 Culture (c. 3600–2050 BCE), Machang 馬廠 Type (c. 2300–2000 BCE), Qijia 齊家 Culture (c. 2050–1915 BCE), and Siba 四壩 Culture (c. 2000–1600 BCE)."

At Dengjiawan, in the Shijiahe site complex in Hubei, some pieces of copper were discovered; they are the earliest copper objects discovered in southern China. The Linjia site (林家遺址, Línjiā yízhǐ) has the earliest evidence for bronze in China, dating to c. 3000 BCE.

Bronze

The Erlitou culture (c. 1900 – 1500 BCE), Shang Dynasty (c. 1600 – 1046 BCE) and Sanxingdui culture (c. 1250 – 1046 BCE) of early China used bronze vessels for rituals (see Chinese ritual bronzes) as well as farming implements and weapons.  By 1500 BCE, excellent bronzes were being made in China in large quantities, partly as a display of status, and as many as 200 large pieces were buried with their owner for use in the afterlife, as in the Tomb of Fu Hao, a Shang queen.

In the tomb of the first Qin Emperor and multiple Warring States period tombs, extremely sharp swords and other weapons were found, coated with chromium oxide, which made the weapons rust resistant. The layer of chromium oxide used on these swords was 10 to 15 micrometers and left them in pristine condition to this day. Chromium was first scientifically attested in the 18th century.

The beginning of new breakthroughs in metallurgy occurred towards the Yangzi River's south in China's southeastern region in the Warring States Period such as gilt-bronze swords.

Section-mold casting
There are two types of bronze smelting techniques in early China, namely the section mold process and the lost-wax process. The earliest bronze ware found in China is the bronze knife (F20: 18) unearthed at the Majiayao in Linjia, Dongxiang, Gansu, and dated to about 3000 BC. This bronze knife uses the section mold process, which is spliced by two molds.

The section mold process is a commonly used bronze casting method in the Shang Dynasty, that is, the mud is selected, and after selecting, filtration, showering, deposition and other procedures, the mud is cooled to a moderate hardness as a backup, and then the mud is made according to the shape of the vessel to be made. There are two types of molds, which is inner mold and outer mold. The inner mold is only the shape of the bronze ware, without decoration; the outer model should consider the division of the bronze ware after casting in the future, that is, the block during the production of the clay model, and also engrave the inscriptions and inscriptions of the bronze ware decoration on the clay model. After the clay mold are done, put it in a cool place to dry in the shade, and then put it into the furnace for roasting. After the mold are heated, they become pottery molds unearthed during modern archaeological discoveries. 
After the pottery mold is fired, do not rush out of the furnace. After the copper furnace has liquefied the required copper, the pottery mold that still has residual temperature is taken out and poured. In this way, the temperature difference between the copper liquid and the pottery mold is not large, and the pottery mold is not easy to burst. The quality of the finished product is relatively high. After the copper liquid is poured, remove the pottery molds and molds according to the blocks they were made. If they can't be removed, they can be broken with a hammer. The bronze will come out, and after grinding, it is the finished product.

Lost-wax casting
According to some scholars, lost-wax casting was used in China already during the Spring and Autumn period (770 – 476 BCE), although this is often disputed.

The lost-wax method is used in most parts of the world. As the name suggests, the lost-wax method is to use wax as a mold, and heat it to melt the wax mold and lose it, thereby casting bronze ware, making the model (the outer layer of the wax model is coated with mud), lost-wax (heating to make the wax flow out), pouring copper liquid to fill the cavity left by the wax model, etc.
The development and spread of the lost-wax method in the West has never stopped, but the main bronze casting method in the Bronze Age in China is the section mold process. When the lost-wax method was introduced into China is also a topic of academic discussion. But there is no doubt that the lost-wax method already existed in China during the Spring and Autumn Period. In 1978, the Bronze Zun-Pan unearthed from the tomb of Marquis Yi of Zeng in Leigudun, Suixian County, Hubei Province, used a mixed process of section mold method and lost-wax method.

The copper liquid used for pouring bronze ware is made of several non-ferrous metal alloys of copper, tin, lead, zinc and aluminum. According to the current scientific tests, the craftsmen at that time had different alloy ratios according to the use of their utensils. There are three types: copper-tin type, copper-aluminum type, and copper-zinc type. Due to the different degrees of softness and hardness of the required utensils, the copper content generally ranges from 80% to 95%.

Iron

In 2008, two iron fragments were excavated at the Mogou site, in Gansu. They have been dated to the 14th century BCE, belonging to the period of Siwa culture. One of the fragments was made of bloomery iron rather than meteoritic iron.

Cast-iron artifacts are found in China before the 5th century BCE, as early as the Zhou dynasty of the 6th century BCE. An Iron Age culture of the Tibetan Plateau has tentatively been associated with the Zhang Zhung culture described in early Tibetan writings.

Around 500 BCE (Spring and Autumn period), metalworkers in the southern state of Wu achieved a temperature of up to 1130 °C, hot enough to use hearth as a blast furnace. At this temperature, iron combines with 4.3% carbon and melts. As a liquid, iron can be cast into molds, a method far less laborious than individually forging each piece of iron from a bloom.

If iron ores are heated with carbon to 1420–1470 K, a molten liquid is formed, an alloy of about 96.5% iron and 3.5% carbon. This product is strong, can be cast into intricate shapes, but is too brittle to be worked, unless the product is decarburized to remove most of the carbon. The vast majority of Chinese iron manufacture, from the late Zhou dynasty onward, was of cast iron. However forged swords began to be made in the Warring-States-period: "Earliest iron and steel Jian also appear, made by the earliest and most basic forging and folding techniques."

Iron would become, by around 300 BCE, the preferred metal for tools and weapons in China.

Middle Ages
Shen Kuo's written work of 1088 contains, among other early descriptions of inventions, a method of repeated forging of cast iron under a cold blast similar to the modern Bessemer process.

Chinese metallurgy was widely practiced during the Middle Ages; during the 11th century, the growth of the iron industry caused vast deforestation due to the use of charcoal in the smelting process. To remedy the problem of deforestation, the Song Chinese discovered how to produce coke from bituminous coal as a substitute for charcoal. Although hydraulic-powered bellows for heating the blast furnace had been written about since Du Shi's (d. 38) invention of them in the 1st century CE, the first known illustration of a bellows in operation is found in a book written in 1313 by Wang Zhen (fl. 1290–1333).

Gold and silver 

During the Qing dynasty the gold and silver smiths of Ningbo were noted for the delicacy and tastefulness of their work.

Cultural significance

Chinese mythology generally reflects a time when metallurgy had long been practiced. According to Mircea Eliade, the Iron Age produced a large number of rites, myths and symbols; the blacksmith was the main agent of diffusion of mythology, rites and metallurgical mysteries. The secret knowledge of metallurgists and their powers made them founders of the human world and masters of the spirit world. This metallurgical model was reinterpreted again by Taoist alchemists.

Some metalworkers illustrate the close relationship between Chinese mystical and sovereign power and the mining and metallurgy industries. Although the name Huangdi is absent from Shang or Zhou inscriptions, it appears in the Spring and Autumn period's Guoyu and Zuo zhuan. According to Mitarai (1984), Huangdi may have lived in early antiquity and led a regional ethnic group who worshiped him as a deity; "The Yellow Emperor fought Chiyou at Mount Kunwu whose summit was covered with a large quantity of red copper".

"The seventy-two brothers of Chiyou had copper heads and iron fronts; they ate iron and stones [...] In the province of Ji where Chiyou is believed to have lived (Chiyou shen), when we dig the earth and we find skulls that seem to be made of copper and iron, they are identified as the bones of Chiyou." Chiyou was the leader of the indigenous Sanmiao (or Jiuli) tribes who defeated Xuanyuan, the future Yellow Emperor. Chiyou, a rival of the Yellow Emperor, belonged to a clan of blacksmiths. The advancement of weaponry is sometimes attributed to the Yellow Emperor and Chiyou, and Chiyou reportedly discovered the process of casting. Kunwu is associated with a people, a royal blacksmith, a mountain which produces metals, and a sword. Kui, a master of music and dance cited by Shun, was succeeded by Yu the Great. Yu the Great, reported founder of the Xia dynasty (China's first), spent many years working on flood control and is credited with casting the Nine Tripod Cauldrons. Helped by dragons descended from heaven, he died on Mount Xianglu in Zhejiang. In these myths and legends, mines and forges are associated with leadership.

See also 

 Economy of China
 Economic history of China before 1912
 Economic history of China (1912–49)

References

Citations

Sources 
 Public domain
 
 
 
 
 
 
 

Economic history of China
History of science and technology in China
China